is a Japanese professional football club located in Sendai, Miyagi Prefecture. They currently play in J2 League, the Japanese second tier of professional football.

History 
Founded in 1988 as Tohoku Electric Power Co., Inc. Soccer Club, Vegalta joined the J-League in 1999 after playing a few years in the JFL, with the nickname Brummell Sendai, to which they had been promoted in 1995 from the Tohoku Regional League.  When joining the J-League, the name Vegalta was chosen as a homage to the famous Tanabata festival in Sendai. The names of the two celestial stars of the Tanabata legend, Vega and Altair were combined to form Vegalta.

They were first promoted to the top flight in 2002 but in the following season the team went back down the following season. They were promoted again for the 2010 season.

In 2011, despite the earthquake and tsunami, they achieved their highest position up to that time, 4th place in the top division.

In 2012, despite leading the table for most of the season, Sanfrecce Hiroshima's challenge proved too strong, and losing the penultimate week game to relegation battler Albirex Niigata cost them the title, rendering them second-place winners, their highest position in history.

In 2018, the Vegalta reached vice place in the Emperor's Cup, losing the cup to the Urawa Reds.

After twelve years spent at the J1 League, Vegalta returned to the J2 on 2022, after being relegated from the J1 on 2021. After finishing on 7th place at the 2022 J2 League, the club was not able to even play the promotion play-offs. Vegalta will play then, their 2nd consecutive season in the J2 on 2023.

Stadium 

Their home stadium is Yurtec Stadium Sendai, in Izumi-ku, Sendai, although a few home games have also been played at nearby Miyagi Stadium.

Sendai Stadium ranks among the top stadiums in Japan for its presence, comfort, and accessibility, and was once ranked second in an evaluation by a famous Japanese football media. It was also used by Azzurri as a camp site during the 2002 FIFA World Cup.

Miyagi Stadium is famous for the Japan national team, and for hosting matches of the Argentina national team in the 2002 FIFA World Cup.

Supporters and rivalries

As with most football clubs, fans in Sendai can hear singing and dancing during matches. However, most of the songs used by fans from other clubs are avoided due to the more eclectic set. Club themes sung before each game are Take Me Home, Country Roads, and during the game. Toy Dolls, Blitzkrieg Bop and other KISS and Twisted Sister songs. Twisted became popular all over the world after the Great East Japan Earthquake.

Since it is the hometown of Hirohiko Araki, the writer of JoJo's Bizarre Adventure, you can see flags with the same motif Araki portrays his characters in the manga.

Michinoku derby
Vegalta's traditional rivals are Montedio Yamagata from Yamagata Prefecture. The two have been rivals since meeting in the Tohoku Football League in 1991. Among the Tohoku derbies, this match is famous as the Michinoku derby.

Tohoku Derby 
This is the derby played by the Tohoku region teams, currently the most important match is that of Vegalta Sendai and Montedio Yamagata. Other teams evaluated for this classic are Blaublitz Akita, Iwate Grulla Morioka, Iwaki FC.

Record

Honours

Team awards
Tohoku Football League Division 1
 Champions (1): 1994 (as Brummell Sendai)
Regional League Promotion Series
 Champions (1): 1994 (as Brummell Sendai)
 J.League Division 1
 Runners-up (1): 2012
 4th place (1): 2011
 J.League Division 2
 Champions (1): 2009
 Runners-up (1): 2001
 J.League Cup
 Semi-finalist (1): 2017
 Emperor's Cup
 Runners-up (1): 2018
 Semi-finalist (1): 2009
 Fair-Play award
 J1: 2013, 2014, 2017, 2018
 J2: 2008, 2009
 Stadium grass best condition award
 Sendai Stadium: 2016

Individual awards
 J. League Best Eleven
  Wilson: 2012
Valuable Player Award
  Takuto Hayashi   Makoto Kakuda   Jiro Kamata: 2011
  Takuto Hayashi   Taikai Uemoto   Makoto Kakuda   Jiro Kamata   Naoki Sugai   Ryang Yong-gi   Shingo Akamine: 2012
  Simão Mate: 2019
 Individual Fair-Play award
  Yuichi Nemoto: 2003
  Ryang Yong-gi: 2011
 J.League Monthly MVP
  Shingo Akamine: 2014 (May)
  Simão Mate: 2019 (June)
  Ryoma Kida: 2022 (May)
 Monthly Best Manager
  Susumu Watanabe: 2019 (June)
  Masato Harasaki: 2022 (May)
 Monthly Best Goal
  Ryang Yong-gi: 2015
  Crislan: 2017
 J.League Cup Award
  Takuma Nishimura: 2017
 TAG Heuer YOUNG GUNS Award
  Takuma Nishimura: 2017
  Ko Itakura: 2018
J.League Cup Top Scorer
  Crislan: 2017
J2 League Top Scorer
  Marcos: 2001
  Borges: 2006
Meritorious Player Award
  Norio Omura: 2009
  Atsushi Yanagisawa: 2015
  Hisato Satō: 2021
  Makoto Kakuda,  Naoki Ishihara,  Yoshiki Takahashi: 2022

Players

Current squad 
.''

Famous players and coaches 

 Edmar 1995–1997
 Pierre Littbarski 1996–1997
 Branko Elsner 1997
 Teruo Iwamoto 2001–2003
 Hajime Moriyasu 2002–2003
 Zdenko Verdenik 2003–2004
 Ryang Yong-gi 2004–2019, 2022-
 Goce Sedloski 2004
 Joel Santana 2006
 Thiago Neves 2006
 Humberlito Borges 2006
 Makoto Teguramori 2008–2013, 2021
 Atsushi Yanagisawa 2011–2014
 Graham Arnold 2014
 Danny Vukovic 2014
 Michael McGlinchey 2014
 Daniel Schmidt 2014–2019
 Takuma Nishimura 2015–2018, 2020–2021
 Ko Itakura 2018
 Simão Mate Junior 2019–2021

International convention 

World Cup
 2018
  Danny Vukovic（2014）
 2022
  Daniel Schmidt（2014–2019）
  Ko Itakura（2018）
  Danny Vukovic

World Cup (Manager)
 2022
  Hajime Moriyasu（2002-2003）
  Graham Arnold（2014）

FIFA Confederations Cup
 2017
  Danny Vukovic
  Michael McGlinchey（2014）

AFC Asian Cup
 2011/2015
  Ryang Yong-gi（2004-2019,2022-）
 2019
  Daniel Schmidt※Runner up
  Danny Vukovic

AFC Asian Cup (Manager)
 2019
  Hajime Moriyasu
  Graham Arnold

Copa América
 2019
  Ko Itakura

OFC Nations Cup
 2016
  Michael McGlinchey※Winner

EAFF E-1 Football Championship
 2015
  Yuji Rokutan（2015-2016）
 2022
  Takuma Nishimura（2015-2018,2020-2021）
  Hajime Moriyasu※Winner

Summer Olympics (U-23)
 2020
  Ko Itakura

Summer Olympics (U-23 Manager)
 2016
  Makoto Teguramori（Manager）
 2020
  Graham Arnold

AFC U-23 Asian Cup
 2016
  Makoto Teguramori※Winner
 2020
  Graham Arnold※3rd place

Asian Games(U-23)
 2018
  Ko Itakura※Runner up

Asian Games(U-23 Manager)
 2014
  Makoto Teguramori

Toulon Tournament(U-22)
 2019
  Keiya Shiihashi（2016-2020）※Runner up,Best XI

Club staff
For the 2023 season.

Managerial history

Mascot and cheerleaders

Mascot 

VEGATTA (Brother)
 He has won "the J League mascot general election" many times and is quite popular.
 The eagle, which is also used in the club emblem as a symbol of victory in Greek mythology, is associated with the Aquila constellation, to which Hikoboshi (Altair) belongs, which is the origin of the club's name. The name was decided by public submission. Vegatta's SNS (BLOG, Twitter), which is updated daily, is loved and popular among soccer fans in Japan, as the mascot loves mischief, and is by some fans, hard to believe it is a mascot.
 LTAANA (Sister)
 From the Sendai summer tradition "Sendai Tanabata", which is the origin of the team name, "Luta" for Vega (Orihime) and Altair (Hikoboshi), and "Tana" for Tanabata, it was named as a girlish name by combining "na", on a 7 August, which is the date of the event and the birthday. Sometimes she tweet with [#ルターナ] (LTAANA written phonetically on Katakana) on Sendai's official Twitter.
 When Vegalta wins any match, she expresses her joy on Twitter.

Cheerleaders 

The Vegalta Cheerleaders mainly support "Vegalta Sendai", participate in many events, and continue to work as a cheering group for people who are doing their best in the area. She has the longest history as a cheerleader for a professional sports team in Sendai, and has been active since 2003.

J Chronicle Best 
This is a project to select the J.League "Best Eleven", "Best Goal" and "Best Match" over the past 20 years. A project held in 2013 to commemorate the 20th anniversary of the Japan Professional Soccer League. The mentioned two game is often featured as a legendary game in each media. ① and ② were selected as "that game I want to see again" on the J League official YouTube channel, and 2 was also selected as "10 Best Matches" by J Chronicle Best.

Even in "Soccer Digest" (Japan's famous football media),the two were selected as "the best 3 selected J.League matches" by the reporter in charge of Sendai. Sendai's Yoshiaki Ota, who scored the equalizing goal against Kawasaki, said, "I think it was a goal that everyone worked together, including the thoughts of my teammates."

*The notation of the match card and the stadium where the match was held is at the time of the match.

Continental record 
Sendai also participated in the ACL for the first time in 2013.

It was a tournament with many challenges other than matches, such as long-distance travel, overcrowded schedule with the J League, and local climate, but they did not lose in the extreme cold of Nanjing and the intense heat of Thailand, and the final match was a draw or better in the qualifying.

It was a good point to leave the possibility of breaking through.

Kit evolution

Asian clubs ranking
.

Vegalta House 
"Shichigashuku Town’ｓ Empty House Revitalization Project: Let's Build a Vegalta House" will start in July 2021 with the support of 143 crowdfunding people and a total of 78 local workers. It is involved in a social collaboration activity, in line with Goal 11 "Sustainable cities and communities" and Goal 17 "Partnership for the goals" of the SDGs basic guidelines.

References

External links
 
 Vegalta-cheerleaders
 
 
 
 
 
  (MASCOT)
  (YOUTH)
  (SCHOOL)

 
Sports teams in Sendai
J.League clubs
Football clubs in Japan
Association football clubs established in 1988
1988 establishments in Japan
Japan Football League (1992–1998) clubs